Alicia Liu was born in Taoyuan County (now Taoyuan City), Taiwan on 12 June 1986. She is a Taiwanese model and television personality, sometimes known by the nickname Xiao Ai.

Liu was assigned male at birth, but underwent sex reassignment surgery at the age of 18. She became popular following a number of appearances on a parody television programme, but was outed in January 2010 by a former schoolmate who posted her graduation photo online. In response, Liu held a press conference where she stated that she was happy being a woman and that the past was not important, but only confirmed that she was a transsexual when interviewed by the China Times a week later. Supported by family, colleagues and her agency, Liu said: "To go public with my sex change was more of a help for me than hindrance, and it had not affected my life".

References

                   

1986 births
Living people
Taiwanese female models
Taiwanese television personalities
People from Taoyuan City
Taiwanese LGBT broadcasters
Taiwanese transgender people
Transgender women
21st-century Taiwanese LGBT people